Albert Robert Valentien (1862–1925) was an American painter, botanical artist, and ceramic artist. He is best known for his work as the chief ceramics decorator at Rookwood Pottery, and for his watercolor paintings of botanical subjects.  In 1908, he accepted a commission from philanthropist Ellen Browning Scripps to illustrate the botanical diversity of California. Over the next ten years, he produced approximately 1200 watercolor "plant portraits" of native California wildflowers, grasses, ferns, and trees.

Biography 
Valentien was born in Cincinnati, Ohio on 11 May 1862, to Anna Marie Wolter and Frederick Valentine. He studied art at the School of Design of the University of Cincinnati (later the Art Academy of Cincinnati), working with Thomas S. Noble and Frank Duveneck. With fellow student John Rettig, Valentien studied decoration of china, learning underglazed pottery decoration from T(homas) J. Wheatley.

He married artist Anna Marie Bookprinter (née Buchdrucker) in 1887.

Rookwood 
In 1884 he joined the Rookwood Pottery Company, and led the art pottery's decoration department for the next twenty years.

In 1903, the Valentiens visited Southern California, staying several months with Anna's brother in Dulzura, a small community southeast of San Diego. During that visit, Valentien produced 135 paintings of California wildflowers, exhibiting the collection at the State Normal School in San Diego (present day San Diego State University).

Retiring from Rookwood in 1905, the Valentiens moved to San Diego in 1908.

California flora 

Ellen Browning Scripps commissioned Valentien to paint a series of illustrations of California wildflowers with the intention of publishing a compendium of the flora of California.  Valentien worked on the project for ten years, and the scope of botanical subjects grew to encompass native grasses, ferns, and trees.  Scripps ultimately decided not to publish the flora. Her estate donated most of his paintings in her collection, 1094 in total, to the San Diego Natural History Museum in 1933.

Albert Robert Valentien died on August 5, 1925 in San Diego, California.

Collections 

Valentien's paintings and art pottery work are represented in collections of the San Diego Natural History Museum, the Cincinnati Art Museum, the California State Library, the Los Angeles County Museum of Art (LACMA), and in private collections.

See also 
List of California native plants

References

Further reading

External links 
 The San Diego Natural History Museum−theNat.org: The Valentien Collection — with 1,094 botanical watercolor paintings.
 San Diego Natural History Museum−theNat.org: Information on the artist, and the conservation/exhibition of his paintings
 The San Diego Natural History Museum Research Library houses a significant collection of Albert Valentien's paintings and papers.

Botanical illustrators
American ceramists
American watercolorists
1862 births
1925 deaths
Painters from California
People associated with the San Diego Natural History Museum
University of Cincinnati alumni
19th-century American painters
American male painters
20th-century American painters
20th-century American male artists
19th-century American male artists
Rookwood Pottery Company